National Council elections were held in Bhutan on 23 April 2013. All candidates ran as independents, as National Council members were prohibited from belonging to a political party.

Electoral system
The 20 members of the National Council were elected in single-member constituencies equivalent to the country's twenty Dzongkhags. A further five members were appointed by the Druk Gyalpo.

Candidates had to register by 31 March, whilst the campaigning period lasted from 1 to 21 April. A total of 67 candidates registered to run in the election, although the Dagana and Trashigang dzongkhags had only one candidate each. In those dzongkhags voters were given the choice of voting against the only candidate.

Election day was a public holiday, and the country's borders were closed for the day.

Results

Aftermath
Following the election Druk Gyalpo Jigme Khesar Namgyel Wangchuck appointed Dasho Karma Yezer Raydi, Kuenlay Tshering, Karma Damcho Nidup, Tashi Wangmo and Tashi Wangyal to the Council.

References

2013
2013 elections in Asia
National Council election
Non-partisan elections
April 2013 events in Asia